Daniel Craig Linfoot (born 8 July 1988 in Knaresborough, North Yorkshire) is a motorcycle road racer who, for 2022, competed at the start of the season in the British Superbike Championship, then in July, halfway through the season, switched to the Superstock category, a support class within the Superbike racing events. He was part of an Endurance race team, and also raced in Superstock at the end of 2021.

Until 2018, Linfoot competed in the British Superbike Championship for Honda Racing, a semi-private Honda-supported race team based in Louth, Lincolnshire, aboard a Honda Fireblade CBR1000RR SP2. For 2019, he rode a Yamaha YZF-R1.

Linfoot has been racing since 2002, when he began his racing career on minibikes, before progressing through to geared bikes in 2003.

From 2003 to present, Linfoot has progressed from 125cc bikes to Superbikes, riding in MotoGP 250cc, World Supersport 600cc, and British Superbikes.

Career

Starting Out
Linfoot started out in 2001–02 in the National Minibike Championships, later moving up the 125cc category in 2004. In 2005 Linfoot came 4th in the championship.

MotoGP, 125cc, 250cc
In 2005, Linfoot make his 125cc Grand Prix debut alongside his compatriot Chris Elkin with wildcard facility at Donington. Linfoot finish the race respectable, 9th place after starting from 39th grid in wet race.

Linfoot then went on to ride in the World 250cc championship in 2007 with Team Sicilia aboard Aprilia RSV 250 replacing Anthony West. In same conditions, Linfoot repeated his best result at Donington who finished the race in 9th again after starting from 21st on the grid.

However, Linfoot failed to score the 6 remaining race. Linfoot was replaced by Federico Sandi onwards.

European Superstock Championship
Linfoot compete European superstock championship in 2008.

British Supersport & Superbikes 2009-Present
For the 2009 season Linfoot moved back to England to race in the British Supersport Championship, Linfoot started well gaining a 3rd position at the first meeting at Brands Hatch. Linfoot was later injured due to a big crash during qualifying at Snetterton breaking his metatarsals. Linfoot returned 3 meetings later at Brands Hatch, gaining 7th and 5th places before been called up to the British Superbike Championship to replace the injured Jon Kirkham. 
Just a week after making his BSB debut Linfoot was given a wildcard entry to the World Supersport Championship at Magny-Cours.

For the 2010 season Linfoot was signed by Rob Mac to ride the Motorpoint/Henderson Yamaha in the British Superbike Championship.

Career statistics
Stats correct as of 9 July 2012

All Time

By championship

Grand Prix motorcycle racing

Races by year
(key) (Races in bold indicate pole position, races in italics indicate fastest lap)

British 125cc Championship

Superstock 600

British Supersport Championship

British Superbike Championship

References

1988 births
Living people
British Supersport Championship riders
British Superbike Championship riders
People from Knaresborough
Supersport World Championship riders 
Sportspeople from North Yorkshire